Oreonectes elongatus is a species of cyprinid of the genus Oreonectes. It inhabits Guangxi, China and has 9 dorsal soft rays, 7 anal soft rays and 38 or 39 vertebrae. It has not been evaluated on the IUCN Red List and was described by Tang, Zhao and Zhang in 2012.

References

Cyprinid fish of Asia
Freshwater fish of China
Fish described in 2012